United Nations Security Council Resolution 4, adopted on April 29, 1946, condemned the Francoist State in Spain and formed a sub-committee to decide whether or not his rule was leading to international friction, and if so, what to do about it.

The resolution was adopted with 10 votes, while the USSR abstained.

See also
List of United Nations Security Council Resolutions 1 to 100 (1946–1953)
United Nations Security Council Resolution 7
United Nations Security Council Resolution 10
Spanish Question (United Nations)

External links
 
Footage of Security Council discussion
Text of the Resolution at undocs.org

 0004
20th century in Spain
Francoist Spain
 0004
1946 in Spain
April 1946 events